Jeremy Patrick Howard (born June 12, 1981), is an American actor. He appeared in the films Sydney White, Galaxy Quest, Accepted, How the Grinch Stole Christmas, and most recently Teenage Mutant Ninja Turtles and  Teenage Mutant Ninja Turtles: Out of the Shadows, where he performed the motion capture and voice for Donatello.

Howard was born in Burbank, California, the son of Sharon Hess and actor Joe Howard.

Filmography

References

External links

1981 births
American male film actors
American male television actors
Living people
Male actors from California